The Flower-class corvette (also referred to as the Gladiolus class after the lead ship) was a British class of 294 corvettes used during World War II by the Allied navies particularly as anti-submarine convoy escorts in the Battle of the Atlantic. Royal Navy ships of this class were named after flowers.

Most served during World War II with the Royal Navy (RN) and Royal Canadian Navy (RCN). Several ships built largely in Canada were transferred from the RN to the United States Navy (USN) under the lend-lease programme, seeing service in both navies. Some corvettes transferred to the USN were crewed by the US Coast Guard. The vessels serving with the US Navy were known as Temptress- and Action-class patrol gunboats. Other Flower-class corvettes served with the Free French Naval Forces, the Royal Netherlands Navy, the Royal Norwegian Navy, the Royal Indian Navy, the Royal Hellenic Navy, the Royal New Zealand Navy, the Royal Yugoslav Navy, and, immediately after the war, the South African Navy.

After World War II, many surplus Flower-class vessels saw worldwide use in other navies, as well as civilian use.  is the only member of the class preserved as a museum ship.

Class designation
The term "corvette" was originally a French name for a small sailing warship, intermediate between the frigate and the sloop-of-war. In the 1830s the term was adopted by the RN for sailing warships of roughly similar size, primarily operating in the shipping protection role. With the arrival of steam power, paddle- and later screw-driven corvettes were built for the same purpose, growing in power, size, and armament over the decades. In 1877 the RN abolished the "corvette" as a traditional category; corvettes and frigates were then combined into a new category, "cruiser".

The months leading up to World War II saw the RN return to the concept of a small escort warship being used in the shipping protection role. The Flower class was based on the design of Southern Pride, a whale-catcher, and were labelled "corvettes", thus restoring the title for the RN, although the Flower-class has no connection with pre-1877 cruising vessels.

There are two distinct groups of vessels in this class: the original Flower-class, 225 vessels ordered during the 1939 and 1940 building programmes; and the modified Flower-class, which followed with a further 69 vessels ordered from 1940 onward. The modified Flowers were slightly larger and better armed.

Flower-class vessels, of original and modified design, in USN service were called Temptress- and Action-class gunboats; they carried the hull classification symbol PG ("patrol gunboat").

Design

In early 1939, with the risk of war with Nazi Germany increasing, it was clear to the Royal Navy that it needed more escort ships to counter the threat from Kriegsmarine U-boats. One particular concern was the need to protect shipping off the east coast of Britain. What was needed was something larger and faster than trawlers, but still cheap enough to be built in large numbers, preferably at small merchant shipyards, as larger yards were already busy. To meet this requirement, the Smiths Dock Company of South Bank -on-Tees, a specialist in the design and build of fishing vessels, offered a development of its 700-ton,  whaler (whale catcher) Southern Pride. They were intended as small convoy escort ships that could be produced quickly and cheaply in large numbers. Despite naval planners' intentions that they be deployed for coastal convoys, their long range meant that they became the mainstay of Mid-Ocean Escort Force convoy protection during the first half of the war.

The Flower class became an essential resource for North Atlantic convoy protection until larger vessels such as destroyer escorts and frigates could be produced in sufficient quantities. The simple design of the Flower class using parts and techniques (scantlings) common to merchant shipping meant they could be constructed in small commercial shipyards all over the United Kingdom and Canada, where larger (or more sophisticated) warships could not be built. Additionally, the use of commercial triple expansion machinery instead of steam turbines meant the largely Royal Naval Reserve and Royal Naval Volunteer Reserve crews that were manning the corvettes would be familiar with their operation.

They were also very lightly armed as they were intended solely for anti-submarine warfare; many of the RCN's original Flower-class ships were initially fitted with minesweeping equipment, while virtually all of the modified Flowers were fitted with a limited anti-aircraft capability. The original Flowers had the standard RN layout, consisting of a raised forecastle, a well deck, then the bridge or wheelhouse and a continuous deck running aft. The crew quarters were in the forecastle while the galley was at the rear, making for poor messing arrangements. The modified Flowers saw the forecastle extended aft past the bridge to the aft end of the funnel, a variation known as the "long forecastle" design. Apart from providing a very useful space where the whole crew could gather out of the weather, the added weight improved the ships' stability and speed and was applied to a number of the original Flower-class vessels during the mid and latter years of the war. The original Flowers had a mast located immediately forward the bridge, a notable exception to naval practice at that time. The modified Flowers saw the mast returned to the normal position immediately aft of the bridge; this does not seem to have been done in all of the modified builds or conversions of the original vessels. A cruiser stern finished the appearance for all vessels in the class.

Orders

The RN ordered 145 Flower-class corvettes in 1939, the first 26 on 25 July with a further batch of 30 on 31 August, all under the 1939 Pre-War Programme. Following the outbreak of World War II, the British Admiralty ordered another 20 on 19 September (all from Harland & Wolff) under the 1939 War Programme. This was followed by an order for a further ten Flower-class corvettes from other British shipbuilders two days later. Another 18 were ordered on 12 December and two on 15 December, again from British shipbuilders. The RN ordered the last ten vessels (under the 1939 War Programme) from Canadian shipbuilders in January 1940.

By the end of January 1940, 116 ships were building or on order to this initial design. The ten vessels ordered from Canadian shipbuilders were transferred to the RCN upon completion. Another four vessels were ordered at Smiths Dock Company for the French Navy, the first ship being completed for the Free French Naval Forces in mid-1940 and the other three being taken over by the RN. Another 31 Flowers were ordered by the RN under the 1940 War Programme but six of these (ordered from Harland & Wolff) were cancelled on 23 January 1941.

The RN ordered 27 modified Flower-class corvettes under the 1941 and 1942 War Programmes. British shipbuilders were contracted to build seven of these vessels under the 1941 Programme and five vessels under the 1942 Programme; two vessels (one from each year's Programme) were later cancelled. The RN ordered fifteen modified Flowers from Canadian shipyards under the 1941 programme; eight of these were transferred to the USN under reverse Lend-Lease.

The RCN ordered seventy original and 34 modified Flower-class vessels from Canadian shipbuilders. The Canadian shipbuilders also built seven original Flowers ordered by the USN, which were transferred to the RN under the Lend-Lease Programme upon completion, because wartime shipbuilding production in the United States had reached the level where the USN could dispense with vessels it had ordered in Canada. The RCN vessels had several design variations from their RN counterparts: the "bandstand", where the aft pom-pom gun was mounted, was moved to the rear of the superstructure; the galley was also moved forward, immediately abaft the engine room.

Shortly after the outbreak of war the French Navy ordered 18 Flower-class vessels, 12 from UK yards, two from Ateliers et Chantiers de France at Dunkirk and four from Ateliers et Chantiers de Penhoët at Saint-Nazaire. The two At. & Ch. de France ships are listed as "cancelled" but the four Penhoët ships were under construction at the time of the Fall of France and were seized by Nazi Germany. Three were completed for Kriegsmarine service and commissioned in 1943–44 as the Patrouillenboot Ausland patrol ships.

Armament

The original Flower class were fitted with a 4-inch (102 mm) gun on the bow, depth charge racks carrying 40 charges on the stern, a minesweeping winch and a 2-pounder (40 mm) pom-pom gun on a "bandstand" over the engine room. Due to shortages, a pair of Lewis guns or quadruple Vickers HMG was sometimes substituted for the pom-pom, which would have left the ship very vulnerable to aircraft attack in its envisaged role of coastal convoy escort and patrol in the North Sea. The long-range endurance of the vessels, coupled with early war-time shortages of larger escort warships, saw Flowers assigned to trans-Atlantic convoy escort where Luftwaffe aircraft were rarely encountered. Vessels assigned to the Mediterranean Sea usually had more anti-aircraft guns fitted. Underwater detection capability was provided by a fixed ASDIC dome; this was later modified to be retractable. Subsequent inventions such as the High Frequency Radio Detection Finder (Huff-Duff) were later added, along with various radar systems (such as the Type 271), which proved particularly effective in low-visibility conditions in the North Atlantic.

The Flower class had been designed for inshore patrol and harbour anti-submarine defence and many required minor modifications when the Allied navies began to use them as trans-Atlantic convoy escorts. These small warships could be supported by any small dockyard or naval station, so many ships came to have a variety of weapons systems and design modifications depending upon when and where they were refitted; there is really no such thing as a 'standard Flower-class corvette'

Several of the major changes that vessels in the class underwent are indicated below, in a typical chronological order:
 Original twin mast configuration changed to single mast in front of the bridge, then moved behind the bridge for improved visibility.
 Heavy minesweeping gear removed for deep-sea escort work and to improve range.
 Galley relocated from the stern to midships.
 Extra depth charge storage racks were fitted at the stern. Later, more depth charges stowed along walkways.
 Hedgehog fitted to enable remote attacks while keeping ASDIC contact.
 Surface radar fitted in a "lantern" housing on the bridge.
 Forecastle lengthened to midships to provide more accommodation and better seaworthiness. Several vessels were given a "three-quarters length" extension.
 Increased flare at the bow. This and the above modification created the modified Flower design for subsequent orders.
 Various changes to the bridge, typically lowering and lengthening it. Enclosed compass house removed.
 Extra twin Lewis guns mounted on the bridge or engine room roof.
 Oerlikon 20 mm cannons fitted, usually two on the bridge wings but sometimes as many as six spread out along the engine-room roof, depending on the theatre of operations.

A ship could have any mix of these, or other specialist one-off modifications. Ships allocated to other navies such as the RCN or USN usually had different armament and deck layouts. A major difference between the RN vessels and the RCN, USN, and other navies' vessels was the provision of upgraded ASDIC and radar. The RN was a world leader in developing these technologies and RN Flowers were somewhat better-equipped for remote detection of enemy submarines. A good example of this is the difficulty that RCN Flowers had in intercepting U-boats with their Canadian-designed SW1C metric radar, while the RN vessels were equipped with the technologically advanced Type 271 centimetric sets. In addition, RCN vessels were incapable of operating gyrocompasses, making ASDIC attacks more difficult.

Operations

Flower-class corvettes were used extensively by the RN and RCN in the Battle of the Atlantic. They also saw limited service elsewhere with the RN, as well as the USN and several Allied navies such as the Royal Netherlands Navy, the Royal Norwegian Navy, the Royal Hellenic Navy, the Free French Naval Forces, the Royal Indian Navy, and the Royal New Zealand Navy. The Belgian Navy used some of these vessels during World War II, and have continued to use Flower names for their minehunters. Most Royal Navy Flower-class ships drew their officers and crew from the Royal Naval Reserve and the Royal Navy Volunteer Reserve (RNVR). Many RN Flowers had captains drawn from the Merchant Navy.

Service on Flowers in the North Atlantic was typically cold, wet, monotonous and uncomfortable. Every dip of the forecastle into an oncoming wave was followed by a cascade of water into the well deck amidships. Men at action stations were drenched with spray and water entered living spaces through hatches opened for access to ammunition magazines. Interior decks were constantly wet and condensation dripped from the overheads. The head (or sanitary toilet) was drained by a straight pipe to the ocean; and a reverse flow of the icy North Atlantic would cleanse the backside of those using it during rough weather. By 1941 corvettes carried twice as many crewmen as anticipated in the original design. Men slept on lockers or tabletops or in any dark place that offered a little warmth. The inability to store perishable food meant a reliance on preserved food such as corned-beef and powdered potato for all meals.

The Flowers were nicknamed "the pekingese of the ocean". They had a reputation of having poor sea-handling characteristics, most often rolling in heavy seas, with 80-degree rolls, 40 degrees each side of upright, being fairly common; it was said they "would roll on wet grass". Many crewmen suffered severe motion sickness for a few weeks until they acclimatised to shipboard life. Although poor in their sea-handling characteristics, the Flowers were extremely seaworthy; no Allied sailor was ever lost overboard from a Flower during World War II, outside combat.

A typical action by a Flower encountering a surfaced U-boat during convoy escort duties was to run directly at the submarine, forcing it to dive and thus limiting its speed and manoeuvrability. The corvette would then keep the submarine down and preoccupied with avoiding depth charge attacks long enough to allow the convoy to pass safely. The low speed also made it difficult for Flowers to catch up with the convoy after action.

This technique was hampered when the Kriegsmarine began deploying its U-boats in "wolf-pack" attacks, which were intended to overwhelm the escort warships of a convoy and allow at least one of the submarines to attack the merchant vessels. Better sensors and armament for the Flowers, such as radar, HF/DF, depth charge projectors and ASDIC, meant these small warships were well equipped to detect and defend against such attacks but the tactical advantage often lay with the attackers, who could mount attacks intended to draw the defending Flower off-station. Success for the Flowers should be measured in terms of tonnage protected, rather than U-boats sunk. Typical reports of convoy actions by these craft include numerous instances of U-boat detection near a convoy, followed by brief engagements using guns or depth charges and a rapid return to station as another U-boat took advantage of the skirmish to attack the unguarded convoy.

Continuous actions against a numerically superior U-boat pack demanded considerable seamanship skills from all concerned and were very wearing on the crews. Thirty-six ships in the class were lost during World War II, many due to enemy action, some to collision with Allied warships and merchant ships. One, sunk in shallow water, was raised and repaired. Of the vessels lost to enemy action, 22 were torpedoed by U-boats, five were mined and four were sunk by aircraft. The Flower-class corvettes are credited with participating in the sinking of 47 German and four Italian submarines. Construction of the Flower-class was superseded toward the end of the war as larger shipyards concentrated on s and smaller yards on the improved  design. The Flower class represented fully half of all Allied convoy escort vessels in the North Atlantic during World War II.

Ships

The following tables list all Flower-class corvettes which served in the Allied navies during World War II.

Flower-class (original)

Free French Navy

Royal Canadian Navy

Royal Navy

South African Navy

Royal Netherlands Navy

Royal Norwegian Navy

Royal Hellenic Navy

United States Navy

Flower-class (modified)

Royal Canadian Navy

Royal Indian Navy

Royal New Zealand Navy

Royal Navy

United States Navy

Vessels lost in action

Kriegsmarine use

In 1940 four Flower-class corvettes were being built in St. Nazaire-Penhoet for the French Navy. They were seized by the Kriegsmarine (German Navy). Three were completed in 1943 and 1944, while the fourth was never finished. Their designation "PA" stood for Patroullienboot Ausland (foreign patrol craft).

Battle credits
U-110 was sunk the next day to preserve the secret.
  was sunk by the corvette  on 11 March 1943
  was sunk by the destroyer  and the corvette  on 11 March 1943
  was sunk by the corvette  on 7 February 1943

Post-war use
The relatively small Flowers were among the first warships to be declared surplus by Allied navies following the end of World War II. They had seen years of hard service in the North Atlantic and were made obsolete by the numerous destroyer escorts and frigates that entered service in the latter part of the war.

32 vessels from the RN, RCN, and USN were transferred to Argentina, Chile, the Dominican Republic, Greece, India, the Republic of Ireland, South Africa, and Venezuela. These were typically operated according to their original design, as coastal patrol vessels, with many serving until the 1970s.

The Irish Navy bought three Flowers in 1946 (and ). The fledgling navy had intended to buy three more corvettes, as well as a number of surplus minesweepers, but severe budget restrictions cancelled these plans, leaving the original three to serve alone through the 1950s and 1960s despite antiquated armament, poor accommodation, and maintenance problems. Taken out of service 1968–1970 and scrapped shortly afterwards. Replaced by s before the building of a similar size vessel, LE Deirdre. Entry into the European Economic Community in 1973 assisted in funding for the building of three future ships.

110 surplus Flowers were sold for commercial use. These saw various careers as mercantile freighters, smugglers, tugs, weather ships, and whalers. The remainder were scrapped. She was declared surplus by the RCN and sold as a towboat specializing in deep-sea salvage. In November 1955, she rescued the freighter Makedonia in the North Pacific, towing the vessel for over one month through severe weather, becoming one of the most famous salvage ships of all time.

Mossad Le'aliyah Bet organized Jewish immigration from Europe into Palestine, in violation of unilateral British restrictions. The corvettes were intercepted in the Mediterranean Sea during the summer of 1946 by the destroyer  and interned in Palestine. After Israel became independent in 1948, these commercial ships were commissioned into the Israeli Navy as the warships Hashomer and Hagana respectively.

Allied navies disposed of their Flowers so quickly following the war, the RN could not supply a single vessel to play Compass Rose in the 1953 film production of Nicholas Monsarrat's novel The Cruel Sea. The Royal Hellenic Navy supplied  (formerly ) for the role prior to her scrapping.

She was laid up in reserve in March 1946 and converted in 1952 to a research vessel for Canadian Department of Marine and Fisheries, a role she served in until the early 1980s when she was acquired by the trust. She has been restored to her wartime appearance and serves in the summer months as a museum ship in Halifax, Nova Scotia, while wintering securely in the naval dockyard at CFB Halifax under the care of Maritime Forces Atlantic, Maritime Command. Sackvilles presence in Halifax is considered very appropriate, given the port was an important North American convoy assembly port during the war. Sackville makes her first appearance each spring when she is towed by a naval tug from HMC Dockyard to a location off Point Pleasant Park on the first Sunday in May to participate in the Commemoration of the Battle of the Atlantic ceremonies held at a memorial in the park overlooking the entrance to Halifax Harbour. Sackville typically hosts several dozen RCN veterans on this day and has also participated in several burials at sea for dispersing the ashes of RCN veterans of the Battle of the Atlantic at this location.

Literature

 Alex H. Cherry wrote Yankee R N, the story of a Wall Street banker who volunteered for active duty in the RN, including details of Flower operations.
 Hugh Garner wrote Storm Below which provides a detailed account of Flower-class corvettes and the stresses of shipboard life during World War II.
 James B. Lamb wrote The Corvette Navy, which accounts the use of these vessels by the RCN during World War II.
 Nicholas Monsarrat wrote the best-known fictionalised account of Flower-class corvette operations in his novel The Cruel Sea. A less well known volume by the same author, Three Corvettes, is a collection of wartime essays of his personal experiences as an officer on board a Flower, although only the first part deals with North Atlantic convoy escort duties.
 Robert Radcliffe wrote Upon Dark Waters, a fictionalized account of Flower-class corvette Daisy, set in 1942 on the North Atlantic.
 Denys Rayner wrote Escort, a first-hand account of his experiences as an officer aboard a Flower.
 Douglas Reeman's 1969 novel To Risks Unknown features the fictional Flower-class corvette Thistle.
 Mac Johnston wrote "Corvettes Canada" aptly subtitled "Convoy Veterans of World War II Tell Their True Stories."

See also
 American Flower-class corvettes
 
 Whale catcher
 List of escorteurs of the French Navy

Notes

References

External links

 The Flower-Class Corvette Forums A dedicated discussion forum which maintains the largest online collection of Flower-Class Corvette images and accessible historical documents.
 uboat.net has pages on the original and revised Flower-classes.
 The Flower-Class Corvette Association 
 HMCS Sackville – The Last Corvette
 "Corvette K-225" – a 1943 film (the real K225 was HMCS Kitchener)
 Flower-Class Corvettes by Bob Pearson & Chris Banyai-Riepl
 1993 film "Lifeline to Victory"—filmed aboard Sackville
 HMS Violet
 Diary of a Petty Officer on HMS La Malouine during Convoy PQ.17.
 1953 film "The Cruel Sea" – based on Nicholas Monsarrat's novel

 
Corvette classes
Battle of the Atlantic
North Atlantic convoys of World War II
Ships of the People's Liberation Army Navy